Mein Schiff 6 is a cruise ship owned by TUI Cruises.

Mein Schiff 6 is similar to Mein Schiff 3, Mein Schiff 4, and Mein Schiff 5 with only minor differences to its sister vessels.

COVID-19 incident 

On 28 September 2020, it was initially reported that 12 crew members of Mein Schiff 6 tested positive for COVID-19 as part of a routine sampling test. The ship was on the route Heraklion (Crete) - Piraeus - Corfu, and continued towards Piraeus for further investigation of the incident. The following morning it was reported that all 12 previously positive crew had now tested negative fuelling uncertainty as to the result of the original tests, while as 2 October, the ship has been given the all clear to continue its journey to Corfu, showing that the incident was almost certainly a false alarm.

References 

Cruise ships
2017 ships
Ships built in Turku
Cruise ships involved in the COVID-19 pandemic